Solpugidae is a family of solifuges or sun spiders. Solpugidae have groups of papillae on their pedipalps or sensory organs. The papillae come out of sockets that are characterized with the function of mechanoreceptor, and contact chemoreceptors, which allows them to respond to stimuli such as touch and sound.

Genera
, the World Solifugae Catalog accepts the following seventeen genera:
 Ferrandia Roewer, 1933
 Metasolpuga Roewer, 1934
 Oparba Roewer, 1934
 Oparbella Roewer, 1934
 Prosolpuga Roewer, 1934
 Solpuga Lichtenstein, 1796
 Solpugassa Roewer, 1933
 Solpugeira Roewer, 1933
 Solpugella Roewer, 1933
 Solpugema Roewer, 1933
 Solpugiba Roewer, 1934
 Solpugista Roewer, 1934
 Solpugisticella Turk, 1960
 Solpuguna Roewer, 1933
 Solpugyla Roewer, 1933 
 Zeria Simon, 1879 
 Zeriassa Pocock, 1895

References

  Simon, 1879 : Essai d'une classification des Galéodes, remarques synonymiques et description d'espèces nouvelles ou mal connues. Annales de la Société Entomologique de France, ser. 5, vol. 9, p. 93-154.

Solifugae
Arachnid families